Password Plus and Super Password are American TV game shows that aired separately between 1979 and 1989. Both shows were revivals of Password, which originally ran from 1961 to 1975 in various incarnations. With only subtle differences between them, both Password Plus and Super Password retained the format of play as their predecessor, with two teams of two people each—a celebrity and a contestant—attempting to guess a mystery word using only one-word clues. A new feature included a series of five passwords as clues to an overarching puzzle for the teams to solve.

Password Plus and Super Password aired on NBC, and were taped on Stage 3 at NBC Studios in Burbank, California. Password Plus was a Mark Goodson-Bill Todman Production and Super Password was a Mark Goodson Production.

Password Plus aired from January 8, 1979 to March 26, 1982, for 801 episodes. The program also won a Daytime Emmy Award for Outstanding Game Show in 1982. Super Password aired for 1,151 episodes from September 24, 1984 to March 24, 1989.

Cast

Hosts
Password Plus was hosted by original Password host Allen Ludden from its debut until April 1980, when he took a leave of absence after being diagnosed with stomach cancer. Bill Cullen, who at the time was hosting the show that preceded Password Plus on NBC, Chain Reaction, filled in until Ludden returned a month later. Ludden left the program again in late October of 1980 due to further health problems and was replaced by Tom Kennedy. Cullen was hosting Blockbusters, another Goodson-Todman production also airing on NBC by this time. Ludden made no further television appearances before his death on June 9, 1981, and Kennedy hosted the remainder of the series.

Bert Convy was the host for the entire run of Super Password.

Announcers
Gene Wood was the regular announcer on both Password Plus and Super Password. Johnny Olson, Bob Hilton, John Harlan, and Rich Jeffries substituted for Wood on different occasions on Password Plus.

Jeffries was the first announcer of Super Password and served as a regular announcer until November 23, 1984. After the first nine weeks, Wood replaced Jeffries as announcer on November 26, 1984. Jeffries and Hilton occasionally substituted for Wood.

Gameplay
The rules for Password Plus and Super Password were almost identical. Two teams, each composed of a contestant and a celebrity, competed. The object, as on the original Password, was for the clue-giving partner to get the receiving partner to guess a given word (the "password"). The giving partner on the first team offered a one-word clue, to which the receiving partner was allowed one guess. There were brief time limits for both the clue and the guess. Teams alternated giving one-word clues until the password was guessed, or until each side had given two clues (three in the early days of Password Plus until June 15, 1979).

The following infractions by the clue-giver forfeited the receiver's chance to guess the password:

 Giving more than one word, or a hyphenated word.
 Giving a word that was not dictionary-valid, as determined by a panel of off-stage judges.
 Taking too much time to give a clue.
 Excessive gestures or physical movement.
 Saying the password or any form of it.

Capitalized words, proper names, and foreign words were allowed, as were vocal inflections intended to lead the receiver to the password. A clue-giver was allowed to repeat a previous clue or guess from either team.

As on the ABC run of Password, the team with initial control of a password on Password Plus had the option to give the first clue or pass to the other team. Originally, the team that did not get the previous password was given the option, but this changed on August 13, 1979. Super Password eliminated the option entirely, requiring the team that guessed a password to give the first clue on the next one.

The rules regarding clue-giving were the same as on all previous versions of Password, with the exception of two instances exclusive to Password Plus. Beginning with the April 23, 1979 episode and continuing until the series' end in 1982, two rules were put into place. The first disallowed any password's direct opposite, or antonym, as a legal clue (such as "loose" for "tight"). The second expanded a penalty already present in the game. When the series began, if the clue-giver given the option to play or pass did not decide in time or failed to give a clue, the other team's clue-giver was allowed to give two clues to his/her partner. After the change, the two-clue penalty was extended to any time a clue-giver failed to give a clue in time. In all cases, the two clues had to be given separately, with one guess at the password after each.

Password Puzzle
The new element of the revivals was the "Password Puzzle". Each password, once revealed, became one of five clues to a puzzle referring to a person, place, or thing. The passwords themselves were not worth any money; only the puzzle affected the scores. Correctly guessing a password allowed that participant one chance to solve the puzzle. If a password was not guessed by either player, it was added to the board without a guess at the puzzle. If that occurred on the final password, or if the solution to the puzzle was inadvertently revealed in any way, the puzzle was removed from play, and a new one was played. If a clue-giver said the password or any form of it (including the final password), or if his/her partner guessed it based on any infraction by the clue-giver, it was added to the board and the guesser on the opposing team was given a chance to solve the puzzle as a penalty.

For the final password in a puzzle, if the guesser was incorrect, his or her partner was given a guess as well. On Password Plus, if both teammates did not guess correctly, the puzzle solution was revealed and a new puzzle was played. On Super Password, if one team failed to guess the puzzle after all five words were revealed, the opposing team's contestant and celebrity partner were each given a final chance to solve it.

A correct guess by either team won money for its contestant, and any remaining passwords were revealed. Additional puzzles were played until one contestant reached the designated goal to win the game.

In 1981, the switch in celebrity partners that normally took place before the start of each game was moved to after the third puzzle. On Super Password, the contestants switched partners before the $300 puzzle. However, on All-Star Specials, partners did not switch after the Cashword game.

Cashword
"Cashword" was an additional bonus on Super Password played by the winner of the second puzzle for an accumulating cash jackpot. The celebrity gave clues to a more difficult password. The contestant won a jackpot which started at $1,000 and increased by that much each time it was not won by guessing the password within three clues. This round did not affect the scores and only awarded bonus money. The Cashword automatically ended following an illegal clue from the celebrity.

Alphabetics/Super Password
The winning team played for a cash prize in the bonus round, called "Alphabetics" on Password Plus and "Super Password" on Super Password.

The gameplay of the round was the same on both shows. The contestant had 60 seconds to guess 10 passwords beginning with consecutive letters of the alphabet (e.g., "A" through "J"), with the celebrity giving one-word clues as in the main game. The celebrity could see only the current password until the contestant either guessed it or the celebrity passed. He/she could use multiple words to form a sentence, but had to pause distinctly after each one. For the period on Password Plus in which opposites were forbidden, this was enforced in Alphabetics as well. The contestant won $100 per guessed word, and a cash jackpot for solving all 10 before time expired.

On Password Plus, the grand prize was originally a flat $5,000, but was reduced by 20% for every illegal clue given. During the period that the main game was played to $500, Alphabetics was played for a jackpot that started at $5,000 and increased by that amount every time it went unclaimed. The penalty for illegal clues remained at 20% of the total at first, changed to a flat $2,500 in late 1981, and reverted to 20% by the final week of the series.

Super Passwords bonus round was also played for the same accumulating jackpot as in the final months of the Plus run. However, if an illegal clue was given, the word in play was eliminated.

Champions retired after playing the bonus round seven times on Password Plus, or five times on Super Password.

Merchandise
Three editions of the Password Plus board game were made by Milton Bradley in the early 1980s. Milton Bradley made an eight-track cartridge version of the game for its OMNI Entertainment System.  In 1983, a version for the Atari 2600 and Intellivision was going to be made by The Great Game Company. However, both versions were scrapped later on due to the Video Game Crash at the time.

A Super Password video game was released for DOS, the Apple II, and the Commodore 64 by Gametek in 1988. A version for the NES was also planned around that time, but never surfaced. In 2000, a Super Password hand-held game by Tiger Electronics was released.

Broadcast history

Password Plus
Password Plus was first shown at 12:30p.m., filling part of the time left when the talk/variety program America Alive! was cancelled. On March 5, 1979, two months after its debut, the series made its first time slot move to noon following the cancellation of NBC’s revival of Jeopardy!. It moved back to 12:30p.m. on August 13, 1979 when the Goodson-Todman game Mindreaders premiered at noon. On June 20, 1980, three other NBC game shows were canceled to make room for David Letterman's morning talk show and in the shuffle that followed, Password Plus was moved on August 4, 1980 to 11:30a.m. when the daytime drama The Doctors moved from 2:00p.m. to 12:30p.m. (this time facing the second half-hour of CBS's The Price Is Right and ABC's Family Feud), with Card Sharks taking the noon slot on June 23, 1980, replacing Chain Reaction.  The series returned to noon on October 26, 1981 upon the cancellation of Card Sharks, and remained there for the remainder of its run. The final episode aired on March 26, 1982, and through a scheduling shuffle its place on NBC's schedule was replaced by Search for Tomorrow (which had moved to the network from CBS).

Super Password
The program returned in September 1984 as Super Password and aired in the noon Eastern time slot, facing, for its first two weeks, the then 8-year-old Family Feud, then Ryan's Hope on ABC. Although several stations passed on it to air local news or syndicated programming, Super Password remained in that time slot for its entire 4½-year run. Later in the decade, NBC affiliates began dropping most of the network's daytime game shows, along with Super Password. The increasing number of stations carrying local newscasts at noon during this time caused the program to experience a decline in its viewership. The show's final episode aired on March 24, 1989, the same day Sale of the Century aired its series finale.

Super Password was Bert Convy's last network game show (and final for Mark Goodson Productions) hosted before his death two years later. Though he emceed a pilot for an ABC revival of Match Game in late 1989, he was too ill to host when it was picked up a year later (the hosting duties ultimately went to Ross Shafer for the series). Convy later hosted Win, Lose or Draw and 3rd Degree for syndication before his death from brain cancer in 1991.

International versions

Episode status
Both shows exist in their entirety, and can currently be seen on Buzzr. Both shows were previously aired on GSN. However, certain episodes were not shown due to celebrity clearance issues that were out of GSN's control.

Beginning on July 2, 2018, GameTV in Canada began airing the first 65 episodes of Super Password.

Kerry Ketchem
In January 1988, a man later discovered to be a previously convicted felon with active warrants for his arrest appeared on Super Password. Kerry Ketchem, who competed on the program under the name "Patrick Quinn", won a total of $58,600 in cash over four days on Super Password, which included a record-tying $55,000 jackpot win in the bonus round. However, his appearance on the show led to his apprehension on charges of fraud.
	
Ketchem's arrest came as the result of an investigation started when a bank manager in Anchorage, Alaska, called the United States Secret Service after having seen his episodes. He was discovered to have outstanding fraud warrants in Alaska and Indiana, and producer Robert Sherman was contacted by the Secret Service shortly thereafter. Around the same time, Ketchem—claiming that he was leaving the country on work-related business—called Mark Goodson Productions and asked if he could collect his winnings in person instead of having a check mailed to him, which is the usual standard procedure. Sherman said yes, with the knowledge of the Secret Service, and gave him a date and time. When Ketchem showed up to the Goodson offices he was apprehended and taken into custody by local officials. The arrest came two days after his appearances finished airing. Booked on the outstanding Indiana warrant, Ketchem was found to have used his "Patrick Quinn" alias (which came from the name of one of Ketchem's college professors) to commit credit card fraud in Alaska; to defraud a used car dealer; and to collect illegally on an insurance policy on the life of his ex-wife. Ketchem, who had previously spent 18 months in prison on an unrelated felony charge, agreed to a plea deal in May 1988 on charges of mail fraud. He was sentenced to five years in prison and his winnings were rescinded as he was ruled to have violated contestant eligibility rules.

See also
Password
Million Dollar Password

Notes

References

External links
 
 

1970s American game shows
1979 American television series debuts
1982 American television series endings
1980s American game shows
1984 American television series debuts
1989 American television series endings
Daytime Emmy Award for Outstanding Game Show winners
English-language television shows
NBC original programming
Television series by Mark Goodson-Bill Todman Productions
Television series by Fremantle (company)
American television series revived after cancellation